

Act of the Scottish Parliament

}}

See also
List of Acts of the Scottish Parliament

References
Current Law Statutes 1999. Volume 3. Chapter asp 1.

1999